Harle may refer to:

Places 
 Harle (river), a river in North Germany
 Harle (gat), a gat between the East Frisian Islands of Spiekeroog and Wangeroog
 Harle (Chrono Cross), a video game character

People with the surname
 Harle Freeman-Greene (born 1934),  diplomat of New Zealand
 Danny L Harle, British music producer and composer
 David Harle (born 1963), English footballer
 Graham Harle (born 1931), Canadian politician
 John Harle (born 1956), saxophonist and composer
  (born 2005), French screenwriter
 Mark Harle, singer and drummer
 Mike Harle (born 1972), English footballer
 Sid Harle, American judge and politician
 Tamás Harle (born 1960), Hungarian journalist and author
 Teal Harle (born 1996), Canadian skier
 Vilho Harle (born 1947), Finnish academic

Other uses
 Harle Airfield, Friesland, Lower Saxony, Germany

See also 
 Harle Syke, a village in England
 Harl
 Herle (disambiguation)